Jassim Salman Al Muawda (November 25, 1936 – May 16, 2017) was a Bahraini educator, association football player and coach, musician, and singer.

Biography

Early life
Al Muawda was born in the Sheikh Abdullah neighborhood of Muharraq. In 1944, he and his sister Latifa to become Hafiz (memorizers of the Quran), then in 1946, he enrolled at the Al-Hidaya Al-Khalifia Boys School. From 1947 to his graduation in 1954, he studied at Victoria College, Alexandria, Egypt.

Education
In 1956, on the recommendation of diplomat and Scouting Movement pioneer Saif bin Jabr Al-Musallam, Al Muawda was hired by the Ministry of Education to teach physical education and English. Among his most prominent students were Ministers Tariq Al-Moayad, Ibrahim Abdul Karim, Habib Ahmed Qassem, Ghazi Abdul Rahman Al Gosaibi, painter Abdullah Al Muharraqi, poet Abdul Rahman Rafii, and politician Muhammad Al-Khalifat. He left the teaching profession in 1957.

Athletic career
In 1955, Al Muawda joined Al-Muharraq SC as a player. For the 1956-1957 and 1957-1958 seasons, he simultaneously coached Al-Muharraq and Al-Ahli Club and led Al-Muharraq to two Bahraini Premier League championships, while both teams reached the finals of the Bahraini King's Cup in 1958 with Al-Muharraq the victor. In 1958, a dispute with the president of Al-Muharraq, Sheikh Ali bin Muhammad Al Khalifa, led Al Muawda to resign and move to Al-Nasr SC, which would win the 1959-1960 Premier League Championship, ending Al-Muharraq]’s five-year winning streak.

In 1958, Al Muawda founded a permanent referee committee for national championships with Ali Kamanja, Abdullah Hamza, Hamza Ali Mirza, Faisal Al Alawi, and Muhammad Taqi. Al Muawda also coached starting in the 1950s for several local teams; he served as the first coach of the Bahrain national football team from 1958 to 1966. The team fought its first official match at the Arab Nations Cup in 1966 to a draw with Kuwait before losing three matches to Lebanon, Iraq, and Jordan. He stayed with Al-Ahli until 1976. Nicknamed the Sheikh of Bahraini trainers, he was also the first physiotherapist in the country, played basketball and volleyball in addition to football, served on the Board of Directors of Al-Ahli, and was close to many foreign sports figures and federations.

Musical career
After he retiring from sports as a player, he formed a band with Issa Ghuloom, Mahdi Zakaria, and Muhammad Salman. Changing its name each week, the band featured Al Muawda on keyboard, guitar, and lead vocals.

Achievements

Al-Muharraq SC
 Bahrain Premier League Championship (2): 1957, 1958
 Bahraini King’s Cup (1): 1958

Al-Ahli Club
 Bahrain Premier League Championship (2): 1969, 1972
 Bahraini King’s Cup (1): 1960, 1968

Death
Al Muawda died on May 16, 2017, and was buried in Muharraq Cemetery the following day.

Legacy
On March 28, 2019, Nasser bin Hamad Al Khalifa, representative of the King of Bahrain for Charitable Works and Youth Affairs, Chairman of the Supreme Council for Youth and Sports, and Chairman of the Bahrain Olympic Committee decided to name the Al-Ahli Club’s new gymnasium after Al Muawda.

Personal life
His aunt Thabija bint Jassim Al Muawda is the wife of Abdullah bin Isa Al Khalifa, brother of King Hamad bin Isa Al Khalifa.

References

1936 births
2017 deaths
People from Muharraq
Bahraini footballers
Al-Muharraq SC players
Al-Ahli Club (Manama) players
Bahraini men's basketball players
Bahraini men's volleyball players
Bahraini football managers
Al-Muharraq SC managers
Al-Ahli Club Manama managers
Bahrain national football team managers
20th-century Bahraini male singers
Bahraini educators
Victoria College, Alexandria alumni
21st-century Bahraini male singers
Association footballers not categorized by position